The CANSA FC.12 was a single engine monoplane ground attack aircraft developed in Italy around 1940. A crew of two were seated in tandem.  Only ten production aircraft were built.

Design and development
The CANSA FC.12 was originally designed as a fighter and dive bomber trainer but the few machines produced were configured for the operational ground attack role.

It was a cantilever low wing monoplane with wings of straight tapered plan and with rounded tips.  The undersides of the wings carried short span dive brakes outside of the full chord, narrow baths into which the main undercarriage retracted backwards, leaving the wheels partly exposed.  In addition there were mid span, mid chord spoilers.

The FC.12 was powered by a 450 kW (600 hp) FIAT A.30 R.A. liquid-cooled V-12 engine, fitted with a chin radiator. The two crew had tandem seats, the aft one behind the wing trailing edge, under a multi-framed canopy.  The horizontal tail was elliptical in plan and mounted on top of the fuselage.  Fin and rudder were similarly shaped, with the rudder ending at the upper fuselage.  All the rear control surfaces were horn balanced and the elevators carried tabs.  There was a small, faired tailwheel on the extreme fuselage.

Four fixed, forward firing 12.7 mm (0.50 in) machine guns provided the main attack armament.  The rear cockpit was provided with a fifth, swivel-mounted gun.

Operational history
Ten ground attack production FC.12s were delivered, though they probably did not see combat.

Operators

Regia Aeronautica

Specifications

References

FC.12
1940s Italian attack aircraft
Single-engined tractor aircraft
Low-wing aircraft
Aircraft first flown in 1940